Suman Kumar Dhar (born 1968) is an Indian molecular biologist and a professor  at the Special Centre for Molecular Medicine of Jawaharlal Nehru University. He is known for his studies on the DNA replication and cell cycle regulation in Helicobacter pylori and Plasmodium falciparum, two pathogens affecting humans. An elected fellow of the National Academy of Sciences, India, Indian National Science Academy and the Indian Academy of Sciences, he is also a recipient of the National Bioscience Award for Career Development of the Department of Biotechnology in 2010. The Council of Scientific and Industrial Research, the apex agency of the Government of India for scientific research, awarded him the Shanti Swarup Bhatnagar Prize for Science and Technology, one of the highest Indian science awards, in 2012, for his contributions to biological sciences.

Biography 
Suman Kumar Dhar, born on 6 March 1968 in the Indian state of West Bengal, graduated in chemistry from Burdwan University in 1989 and completed his master's degree in biochemistry in 1992 from Kalyani University before securing a PhD in molecular biology from Jawaharlal Nehru University (JNU) in 1998. After working  briefly (1997–98) as a research assistant at the department of microbiology of the University of Nebraska, he did his post-doctoral studies at Brigham and Women’s Hospital of Harvard Medical School which he completed in 2001. Returning to India the same year, he joined Jawaharlal Nehru University as an assistant professor at the Special Centre for Molecular Medicine (SCMM) of the university where he rose in ranks to become an associate professor in 2005 and a professor in 2011, finally reaching the position of the chairperson of SCMM in 2011. In between, he served as a visiting fellow at Harvard Medical School (2002–03), Harvard School of Public Health (2003–04) and Bernhard Nocht Institute for Tropical Medicine (2007); he also served as a Humboldt Research Fellow at Bernhard Nocht Institute in 2008. Besides his academic duties at JNU, Dhar is involved in the establishment of Centre of Excellence in Parasitology, a Department of Biotechnology-funded project. He was also a member of the proctorial committee constituted by JNU to inquire about the 2016 JNU protests.

Career 
Dhar's research history starts during his graduate studies when he worked on Entamoeba histolytica, the protozoan which causes amoebiasis, focusing on its ribosomal DNA circle. Later at Harvard Medical School, his post-doctoral studies were centered on mammalian DNA replication which assisted him to identify the ORC6 (origin recognition complex subunit six) and its role in viral DNA replication. He also identified geminin, a replication inhibitor, as a blocking factor of viral DNA replication, a discovery which earned him a US patent. Later, he studied the human pathogens, Helicobacter pylori and Plasmodium falciparum and their DNA replication and cell cycle regulation. He also worked on anti-malarial drugs and proposed Acriflavine as an anti-malarial agent, which has also been patented by him. His work has identified PfGyrase for P. falciparum and HpDnaB helicase for H. pylori as targets and these researches are reported to be helpful in drug discovery efforts for Gastric ulcers, Gastric adenocarcinomas and Malaria.
Dhar has documented his research by way of a number of articles and online repositories such as PubMed and Pubfacts have listed many of them. He has contributed chapters to three books which include Epigenetics: Development and Disease by Tapas Kumar Kundu. He is associated with many science journals such as Journal of Biological Chemistry, Molecular Microbiology, FEBS Journal and Medical Science Monitor as an ad-hoc reviewer and has delivered featured talks including his oration at the Gordon Research Conference on Host-Parasite interaction held in Rhode Island in 2012.

Awards and honors 
While in the US, Dhar received two grants for his researches, a grant from the National Institutes of Health for studies on emerging infectious diseases (1997–98) and the United States Department of the Army grant for research on breast cancer (2000–03). He received the Senior International Research Fellowship of the Wellcome Trust in 2005, the tenancy of the fellowship extending to 2010, and on its expiry, he received the Wellcome Trust-DBT Senior Research Fellowship in 2010. In 2006, Dhar received the Swarnajayanthi Fellowship of the Department of Biotechnology (DBT) and four years later, DBT honored him again with the 2010 National Bioscience Award for Career Development. He was elected to the Guha Research Conference in 2007 and the next year brought him the Alexander Von Humboldt Fellowship and the Swarnajayanti Fellowship of the Department of Science and Technology.

A member of the American Society for Microbiology, Dhar was awarded the Shanti Swarup Bhatnagar Prize for Science and Technology, one of the highest Indian science awards, by the Council of Scientific and Industrial Research in 2012. The National Academy of Sciences, India elected him as a fellow in 2011 and he became a fellow of the Indian National Science Academy and the Indian Academy of Sciences in 2016.

Patents

Selected bibliography

See also 

 Entamoeba histolytica
 Amoebiasis
 ORC6
 Geminin
 Helicobacter pylori
 Plasmodium falciparum
 Acriflavine
 Tapas Kumar Kundu

Notes

References

External links 
 
 
 

Recipients of the Shanti Swarup Bhatnagar Award in Biological Science
N-BIOS Prize recipients
1968 births
Scientists from West Bengal
Living people
Indian molecular biologists
20th-century Indian inventors
Indian scientific authors
University of Burdwan alumni
University of Kalyani alumni
Jawaharlal Nehru University alumni
Academic staff of Jawaharlal Nehru University
University of Nebraska Medical Center alumni
Harvard Medical School alumni
Harvard School of Public Health faculty
Fellows of the Indian Academy of Sciences
Fellows of the Indian National Science Academy
Fellows of The National Academy of Sciences, India
20th-century Indian biologists
21st-century Indian inventors